The 1954 South Dakota State Jackrabbits football team was an American football team that represented South Dakota State University in the North Central Conference (NCC) during the 1954 college football season. In its eighth season under head coach Ralph Ginn, the team compiled a 7–2 record, tied for the conference championship, and outscored opponents by a total of 338 to 151. 

The team's statistical leaders included quarterback Jerry Welch with 625 rushing yards and 478 passing yards. Other key players included center Herb Backlund, tackle Jack Nitz, guard Roger Kerns, and back Roger Denker.

Schedule

References

South Dakota State
South Dakota State Jackrabbits football seasons
North Central Conference football champion seasons
South Dakota State Jackrabbits football